Red Seal (Italian: Sigillo rosso) is a 1950 Italian crime film directed by Flavio Calzavara and starring Gino Cervi, Carla Del Poggio and Adriano Rimoldi.

The film's sets were designed by the art director Alberto Boccianti. It was not a commercial success, earning around 28 million lira at the box office.

Synopsis
After her only son is killed fighting during the Second World War, an elderly widow turns her home into a boarding house to make ends meet. Several of the guests are hunting for a mysterious document, bound with a red seal, entrusted to her by her son.

Cast
Gino Cervi
Carla Del Poggio
Adriano Rimoldi
Linda Sini
Giovanna Scotto
Miranda Campa
Fulvia Mammi
Gabriele Ferzetti
Lia Corelli

References

Bibliography
 Chiti, Roberto & Poppi, Roberto. Dizionario del cinema italiano: Dal 1945 al 1959. Gremese Editore, 1991.

External links
 

1950 films
1950s Italian-language films
Italian crime films
1950 crime films
Italian black-and-white films
Films directed by Flavio Calzavara
1950s Italian films